The white-throated redstart (Phoenicurus schisticeps) is a species of bird in the family Muscicapidae.

It is found in Nepal, Bhutan, central China and far northern areas of Myanmar and Northeast India.

Its natural habitat is temperate forests.

References

white-throated redstart
Birds of Bhutan
Birds of Nepal
Birds of China
white-throated redstart
white-throated redstart
white-throated redstart
Taxonomy articles created by Polbot